Paul Price may refer to:
 Paul Price (American football), American football coach in the United States
 Paul Price (basketball) (–?), American professional basketball player
 Paul Price (footballer) (born 1954), former English footballer
 Paul Price (squash player) (born 1976), squash player from Australia
 P. Buford Price, American nuclear physicist

See also
 Paul Preiss (born 1980), American actor